Aedas is an architectural firm with eleven International offices founded by the Welsh architect Keith Griffiths. Aedas provides services in architecture, interior design, urban design, masterplanning and graphic design. It was established in 2002.

History

Establishment 
Aedas was established in 2002 and opened its first China office in the same year. 

Aedas was appointed to design Fortune Plaza 1 (2003). Other mixed-commercial projects in Beijing include, R&F City, R&F Plaza and R&F Centre in Beijing. The company set up offices in Macau (2004), Shanghai (2005) and Chengdu (2005).

Aedas Singapore was appointed to design various rail works of Jurong East Integrated Transport Hub and MRT stations. Also, Aedas completed mixed-use and residential projects including The Star, Shaw Tower and Woodlands North Coast.

In Macau, Aedas delivered its first integrated casino resort project, Sands Macau in 2004. Aedas was commissioned as lead architect for The Venetian Macao (2007).

The company was commissioned to design Dubai Metro (2004). The Dubai office was established in 2005 and the Abu Dhabi office was set up in 2007. In 2010 and 2011, Ocean Heights, Boulevard Plaza and Ubora Towers, in Dubai, were completed.

Notable projects

 Hong Kong West Kowloon Station, Hong Kong
 Hong Kong–Zhuhai–Macau Bridge Hong Kong Boundary Crossing Facilities (HKBCF) Passenger Clearance Building
 Terminal 2 & Terminal 2 Expansion
 Hong Kong International Airport Midfield Concourse
 Chongqing Gaoke Group Ltd Office Project, Chongqing, China (2022)
 Hengqin International Financial Centre, Zhuhai, China (2020)
 Star Performance Centre, One North, Singapore
 Sandcrawler, Singapore
 Heartland 66 Office Tower 
 Dubai Metro, Dubai, UAE.

Work in mixed-commercial sector (2010s)
Aedas' designed completed mixed-commercial projects include The Star in Singapore (2012), Lè Architecture in Taipei (2017), Starlight Place in Chongqing (2011), Center 66 in Wuxi (2014), Evergrande Plaza in Chengdu (2015), Sincere Financial Center in Chongqing (2015), and Olympia 66 in Dalian (2015).

In 2006, Aedas was in partnership with Davis Brody Bond and completed Building Cure, and established a Seattle office to expand its footprints since then. 
Aedas was included in Building Design magazine’s list of the world’s ten largest architectural practices since 2006. It remains in Top 10 to date.

Recent work
Aedas has completed more than one-hundred projects. 
Projects include:

Boulevard Plaza, Dubai, UAE
Centres of Central, Hong Kong
Emporium Mall, Lahore, Pakistan
Hong Kong International Airport Midfield Concourse and North Satellite Concourse, Hong Kong
Olympia 66, Dalian, Liaoning, China
R&F Centre, Guangzhou, Guangdong, China
Express Rail Link West Kowloon Terminus, Hong Kong
Xi'an Jiaotong-Liverpool University Central Building, Suzhou, Jiangsu, China
Lè Architecture, Taipei, Taiwan
Taichung Commercial Bank Headquarters, Taichung, Taiwan

References

External links

2002 establishments in England
Architecture firms based in London
Architecture firms of Hong Kong
Companies established in 2002